General Becker may refer to:

Bradley Becker (fl. 1980s–2020s), U.S. Army lieutenant general
Carl Becker (general) (1895–1966), German Army lieutenant general
Fritz Becker (general) (1892–1967), German Wehrmacht lieutenant general
Hellmuth Becker (1902–1953), German SS brigadier general 
Quinn H. Becker (born 1930), U.S. Army lieutenant general